The Orders, decorations, and medals of Sweden have a historical basis, reaching back to the 1606 founding of the extinct Jehova Order. The Royal Order of Knights of Sweden were only truly codified in the 18th century, with their formal foundation in 1748 by Frederick I of Sweden. Significant reforms in 1974 changed the conditions and criteria under which many orders and decorations could be awarded.

In 2019, a parliamentary committee was instructed to establish guidelines on how to re-introduce the Swedish orders, including the Order of the Polar Star, into the Swedish honours system, and how Swedish citizens again can be appointed to Swedish orders. The committee presented its findings in September 2021 and the Government has declared that a bill on the subject would be presented to the Riksdag on April 19th 2022. The bill passed the Riksdag by a large majority on 19 June 2022. 

On 20 December 2022, the Swedish Government published a new regulation that repealed the 1974 regulation, and once again opened the Royal Orders to Swedish citizens again and reactivated the Sword Order and Vasa Order, which in came in affect from 1 February 2023.

Orders

Royal orders of knighthood
 Royal Order of the Seraphim (Serafimerorden)
 Order of the Sword (Svärdsorden)
 Order of the Polar Star (Nordstjärneorden)
 Order of Vasa (Vasaorden)
 Order of Charles XIII (Carl XIII:s orden)

Orders of knighthood under royal patronage
 Order of St John in Sweden (Johanniterorden)

Fraternal orders under royal patronage
 Swedish Order of Freemasons (Svenska Frimurare Orden)
 Order of Coldin (Coldinuorden)
 Par Bricole (Par Bricole)
 Order of Svea (Svea Orden)
 Geatish Society (Götiska Förbundet)
 Order of Neptune (Neptuniorden)
 Order of Amarante (Stora Amaranterorden)
 Order of Innocence (Innocenceorden)

Decorations and medals of the Royal Orders
 Seraphim Medal
 Medal of the Sword
 Royal Order of Vasa - Silvercross (Vasasign)
 Medal of the Royal Order of the Polar Star - 8th size
 Medal of the Royal Order of Vasa in Gold, 5th size
 Medal of the Royal Order of Vasa in Silver, 5th size

Royal Medals presented by the King
 Royal Jubilee Commemorative Medals
 H. M. The King's Medal
 Litteris et Artibus
 Prince Eugen Medal
 Prince Carl Medal

Royal Medals presented by the Government
 Illis Quorum
 Medal for Commendable Deeds
 Medal for Civic Virtue
 Medal for Diligent Reindeer Husbandry

War decorations
Royal Order of the Sword - Grand Cross - Knight 1st Class (dormant - last awarded 1942)
Royal Order of the Sword - Grand Cross - Knight (dormant)
For Valour in the Field, Gold (awarded only in time of war)
For Valour at Sea, Gold (awarded only in time of war)
Royal Order of the Sword War Cross in Gold (never awarded)
Swedish Armed Forces Medal of Merit in gold with sword  (2009-) (highest military award in peacetime)
Swedish Armed Forces Medal for Wounded in Battle, Gold (only awarded posthumously)
For Valour in the Field, Silver (awarded only in time of war)
For Valour at Sea, Silver (awarded only in time of war)
Royal Order of the Sword War Cross in Silver (never awarded)
Swedish Armed Forces Medal of Merit in silver with sword (2009-)
Swedish Armed Forces Medal for Wounded in Battle, Silver 
Royal Order of the Sword War Cross in bronze (never awarded)

Military medals
Military medals:
Swedish Armed Forces Medal for Wounded in Battle (2011–)
gold (only posthumously awarded)
silver with star (repeatedly awards)
silver
Swedish Armed Forces Medal of Merit (1995–2007)
gold with swords
silver with swords
gold
silver
Swedish Armed Forces International Service Medal of Reward with Swords (1995–2007)
gold
silver
Swedish Armed Forces Medal of Merit (2008–)
gold
silver
Swedish Armed Forces Conscript Medal (2002–2010)
Swedish Armed Forces Reserve Officer Medal (2003/2008–)
gold
silver
Swedish Armed Forces Service Medal for National Defense (2015-)
gold with Three Crowns ribbon device
gold
silver
bronze
Swedish Armed Forces International Service Medal (1991/1994/2012–)
bronze
with medal clasp (Name of the mission area)
with medal clasp and laurel wreath (Honorary Award)
with medal clasp and palm (Field hospital in Saudi Arabia)
with medal clasp and crossed spears (Somalia)
with medal clasp and Star (Liberia)
with medal clasp and a Dromedary (Early missions in Afghanistan)
with medal clasp and laurel wreath (Georgia OSSE, Former Yugoslavia)

See also
List of honours of the Swedish royal family by country
List of honours of Sweden awarded to heads of state and royalty

References

Orders, decorations, and medals of Sweden
Sweden